Sputnik was a Soviet magazine published from 1967 until 1991 by the Soviet press agency Novosti in several languages, targeted at both Eastern Bloc countries and Western nations. It was intended to be a Soviet equivalent to Reader's Digest, publishing news stories excerpted from the Soviet press in a similar size and paper.

Although already censored by the Soviet government, Sputnik was at times censored by the governments of countries at odds with the Kremlin as the magazine's editors were replaced with pro-Capitalist editors during glasnost, the most noted examples being East Germany in November 1988 and Cuba in 1989.

See also
 Sputnik Monthly Digest, English-language edition of this magazine
 Sputnik (news agency)
 Soviet Life

References

External links
 Some issues for 1968-74 period
 22 issues from 1968-82 period
 The December 1982 issue (60th anniversary of the USSR)
 

1967 establishments in the Soviet Union
1991 disestablishments in the Soviet Union
Magazines published in the Soviet Union
Eastern Bloc mass media
Former state media
Magazines established in 1967
Magazines disestablished in 1991
Multilingual magazines
Magazines published in Moscow